Henrietta Battier (c.1751 – 1813) was an Irish poet, satirist, and actress.

Biography
Henrietta Fleming married the son of a Dublin, Ireland banker and had at least four children. While on a visit to London in 1783–4, she approached Samuel Johnson to request his advice about publishing a manuscript collection of poems. Johnson was encouraging and helped her to build a subscription list. He reportedly said to her, "Don't be disheartened my Child, I have been often glad of a Subscription myself." His death in 1784, however, delayed Battier's plans and The protected fugitives was not published until 1791. While she was in London, she acted the role of Lady Rachel Russell in Thomas Stratford's tragedy on the death of Lord Russell, at the Drury Lane Theatre. Thereafter, both she and her husband became seriously ill, and a son died, in 1789, possibly predeceased by his sister. Back in Dublin, as "Patt. Pindar," she published a series of pointed political lampoons beginning with The Kirwanade: "magnificently controlled vituperation in vigorous, colloquial heroic couplets." Her subsequent satires argued for reform, religious tolerance, and Irish independence. They would seem to have sold well, but her financial circumstances were straitened. She died in Dublin in 1813.

Selected works 
The Mousiad: an Heroic-Comic Poem. Dublin: P. Byrne, 1787 (attributed).
The protected fugitives: a collection of miscellaneous poems, the genuine products of a lady, never before published. 1791.
The Kirwanade, or, Poetical Epistle. Humbly Addressed to the Modern Apostle. Published in two parts, 1791.
The Gibbonade, or, Political Reviewer. Three issues, 1 May 1793 – 12 September 1794.
Marriage Ode Royal after the Manner of Dryden. Dublin and London, 1795.
The Lemon. 1797.
An Address on … the Projected Union, To the Illustrious Stephen III, King of Dalkey, Emperor of the Mugglins. 1799.

Notes

Bibliography 
"Battier, Henrietta (Fleming)." The Feminist Companion to Literature in English. Virginia Blain, et al., eds. New Haven and London: Yale UP, 1990. 70.
Grundy, Isobel. “Battier , Henrietta (c.1751–1813).” Oxford Dictionary of National Biography. Ed. H. C. G. Matthew and Brian Harrison. Oxford: OUP, 2004. 5 Apr. 2007.

1751 births
1813 deaths
18th-century Irish actresses
18th-century Irish women writers
18th-century Irish writers
Irish women poets
Irish emigrants to Great Britain
Irish satirists
Women satirists